The Situation Room, officially known as the John F. Kennedy Conference Room, is a  conference room and intelligence management center in the basement of the West Wing of the White House. It is run by the National Security Council staff for the use of the President of the United States and his advisors (including the National Security Advisor, the Homeland Security Advisor and the White House Chief of Staff) to monitor and deal with crises at home and abroad and to conduct secure communications with outside (often overseas) persons. The Situation Room is equipped with secure, advanced communications equipment for the president to maintain command and control of U.S. forces around the world.

Origin and staff

The Situation Room was created in 1961 on the order of President John F. Kennedy after the failure of the Bay of Pigs invasion was attributed to a lack of real-time information. The room has secure communications systems built into it, and the walls contain wood panels that hide different audio, video and other systems.

The Situation Room staff is organized around five watch teams that monitor domestic and international events. Each watch team includes three duty officers, a communications assistant, and an intelligence analyst, though the number and composition of the teams may vary, depending on shift requirements and workload. The teams are staffed from a pool of approximately 30 senior personnel from various agencies in the intelligence community and from the military. These members are handpicked from heavily vetted nominations made by their parent agencies and are strictly apolitical. They stand watch on a 24-hour basis, constantly monitoring world events and keeping senior White House staff apprised of significant incidents.

Functions

The mission of the Situation Room is to provide current intelligence and crisis support to the NSC staff, the National Security Advisor, and the President.
In effect, the Situation Room is a 24/7 meeting place for sensitive information flowing into and out of the White House. It is also the funnel through which most communications, especially classified information, will pass when the president is not in residence. It is an essential link, providing the traveling White House with access to all the information available from Washington's national security community.

The day begins with the watch team's preparation of the Morning Book. Prepared for the President, Vice-President, and most senior White House staff, the Morning Book contains a copy of the National Intelligence Daily, the State Department's Morning Summary, and diplomatic cables and intelligence reports. The Morning Book is usually in the car when the national security advisor is picked up for work. The morning routine also includes the President's Daily Brief, which is prepared by the Office of the Director of National Intelligence, hand-delivered, and briefed by an intelligence community officer to the president and other NSC principals.

In addition, the Watch Teams produce morning and evening summaries of highly selective material. These summaries, targeted on current interagency issues, are transmitted electronically to the NSC staff.

The Situation Room staff also provides alerts on breaking events to NSC and White House personnel. Responsibility for informing the president belongs to the national security adviser. Later, a written "Sit Room Note" will be prepared, summarizing the event with up-to-the-minute reports from other centers, perhaps including a photo, diagram, or map. The task of the Situation Room staff is to ensure that the president and national security advisor are informed not only of the current situation but also how the situation is being portrayed by the media.

Another typical Situation Room activity is arranging the president's phone calls and other sensitive communications with foreign heads of state. This includes coordinating the timing of such calls at each end, providing interpreters where necessary, and ensuring appropriate security and record keeping. In this function, the Situation Room coordinates closely with the White House Communications Agency.

2006–2007 renovations
 

The only comprehensive renovation of the Situation Room took place from 2006 to 2007. Prior to the renovation, the room used cathode ray tubes for monitors and fax for communication and had computers and telephones with 1985-era technology. The room also had a small kitchen with no sink. Encrypted audio/visual equipment was also unreliable, and such equipment would sometimes go black, "prompting a presidential outburst". The Situation Room was once described as "uncomfortable, unaesthetic and essentially oppressive," while others termed the pre-renovation complex "something of a low-tech dungeon."

Planning for the renovation began before the September 11, 2001, attacks, although the project became more urgent afterward.

Renovations began in August 2006, when the Situation Room complex was gutted down to bricks and bare floor and rebuilt from the ground up. The complex was renovated over about four and a half months and was disruptive, particularly to White House chief of staff Joshua Bolten, whose office was directly above it. The New York Times reported that "Staff members described sitting in his room and hearing ear-piercing noise or watching water ripple in glasses on his desk as the floor shook." The renovation yielded several pieces from decades before, including coaxial cables, columns and a frame window from a Franklin D. Roosevelt–era sunken courtyard that was later built over.

The renovations also included an expansion of the Situation Room's use from only the National Security Council to include the Homeland Security Council and office of the White House chief of staff. Some of the mahogany was removed to reduce noise, and three secure video rooms were added in addition to the two already in place. A secure direct feed to Air Force One was added. Additionally, the room was revamped to make future technological upgrades easier—"so you don't have to carve a hole in an antique mahogany wall to improve it," according to Deputy White House Chief of Staff Joe Hagin.

Sensors were installed in the ceilings to detect cellular signals to prevent unauthorized communications and bugging by mobile phones, personal digital assistants, and other devices. Before the renovation, the Secret Service confiscated phones but had no other means of preventing smuggled communication devices. The new complex includes a lead-lined cabinet near the reception area for the deposit of personal communication devices upon entry. Close by are glass-encased booths (which the Associated Press described as "retro-looking") for secure and private telephone calls.

The seating of the room was also changed to add "two tiers of curved computer terminals that can be fed both classified and unclassified data from around the country and the world" for watch officers (who before the renovation were seated "so they stared at walls rather than each other"). The new Situation Room has six flat panel display televisions for secure videoconferencing.

The renovation was formally completed by mid-May 2007. On May 17, 2007, President George W. Bush and British prime minister Tony Blair participated in a video conference with members of their Iraq teams from the newly renovated Situation Room. The following day, President Bush officially opened the newly refurbished Situation Room in a ribbon-cutting ceremony.

See also

References

Further reading

External links

Inside The White House Situation Room: A National Nerve Center, CIA Center for the Study of Intelligence
White House Museum: West Wing ground floor, with floor plan and historical images

Rooms in the White House
United States National Security Council
Articles containing video clips
1961 establishments in Washington, D.C.